The women's individual was one of two events for women out of four total events on the archery programme at the 1988 Summer Olympics.

Summary

 Preliminary ranking round
Each archer shot a FITA round, consisting of 144 arrows split evenly between the distances of 70 metres, 60 metres, 50 metres, and 30 metres.  The top 24 archers qualified for the next round.

The Korean women, who had begun to show strength in the sport four years earlier, completely dominated the preliminary round.  They took the three top places as Kim Soo-Nyung shattered the previous Olympic record for a FITA round.  The Soviet Union also qualified three archers for the next round when all three placed in the top eight.  Chinese Taipei, the United States, China, Sweden, Indonesia, and Great Britain had two archers advance.

 1/8 final
Each archer shot one quarter of the normal number of arrows in a FITA round.  The 36 arrows were split evenly between the four distances of 70 metres, 60 metres, 50 metres, and 30 metres.  The top 18 archers qualified for the quarterfinals.

All three Korean women and all three Soviet archers advanced, as did two archers from Sweden, Chinese Taipei, and Great Britain.  China, Indonesia, France, Poland, West Germany, and the United States each had one archer move on.

 Quarterfinal
Each archer shot one quarter of the normal number of arrows in a FITA round.  The 36 arrows were split evenly between the four distances of 70 metres, 60 metres, 50 metres, and 30 metres.  The top 12 archers qualified for the semifinals.

The Soviet women had a relatively poor round, each of the three dropping at least six places in the standings.  Boutouza fell all the way to last place, and Mountain was nearly eliminated as well.  The Koreans, on the other hand, continued to shoot well, recapturing the top two spots.

 Semifinal
Each archer shot one quarter of the normal number of arrows in a FITA round.  The 36 arrows were split evenly between the four distances of 70 metres, 60 metres, 50 metres, and 30 metres.  The top 8 archers moved on to the semifinals.

There was very little movement in the rankings, as seven of the archers retained the same positions they had in the quarterfinal.  Korea again advanced all three of its archers.  The remaining Soviet women both advanced, though no other nation advanced more than one archer.  Sweden, Great Britain, and West Germany each sent one archer to fill out the top eight.

 Final
Each archer shot one quarter of the normal number of arrows in a FITA round.  The 36 arrows were split evenly between the four distances of 70 metres, 60 metres, 50 metres, and 30 metres.  Medals were awarded to the top three archers in the final round.

The Korean women performed the first sweep of an archery events medals since the establishment of modern Olympic archery.  It was not a foregone conclusion, however, as Yun Young-Sook required a tie-breaker to defeat Arjannikova of the Soviet Union.

Results

References

External links
Official Olympic Report

Archery at the 1988 Summer Olympics
1988 in women's archery
Women's events at the 1988 Summer Olympics